Kevin Weymouth  is a footballer who represented New Zealand at international level.

Weymouth made his full All Whites debut in a 2–1 win over China on 20 July 1975 and ended his international playing career with 12 A-international caps and 1 goal to his credit, his final cap an appearance in a 1–1 draw with Australia on 30 March 1977.

References

External links

Year of birth missing (living people)
Living people
New Zealand association footballers
New Zealand international footballers

Association footballers not categorized by position